Jeffrey Chipps Smith is an American art historian specialising in the Northern Renaissance and Baroque art and architecture. He has published a number of prize winning books on art history. In 2005 he wrote the introduction for a reprint of Erwin Panofsky's classic "The Life and Art of Albrecht Dürer". He is an inaugural co-editor of the Journal of the Historians of Netherlandish Art.

Publications
 New Perspectives on the Art of Renaissance Nuremberg: Five Essays. Austin, 1985
 German Sculpture of the Later Renaissance, c. 1520-1580: Art in an Age of Uncertainty. Princeton, 1994
 Sensuous Worship: Jesuits and the Art of the Early Catholic Reformation in Germany. Princeton, 2002
 The Northern Renaissance. London: Taschen, 2004
 The Art of the Goldsmith in late Fifteenth-Century Germany: The Kimbell Virgin and Her Bishop. New Haven, 2006
 The Essential Dürer. Philadelphia, 2010
 Dürer. London, 2012

References 

American art historians
Living people
Year of birth missing (living people)